Titterton is a surname. Notable people with the surname include:

David Titterton (born 1971), British former professional footballer
Ernest William Titterton Ph. D. (1916–1990), nuclear physicist and professor
Frank Titterton (1893–1956), well-known British lyric tenor of the mid twentieth century
George F. Titterton (1904–1998), design engineer and Senior Vice-President of the Grumman Corporation
Maud Titterton (1867–1932), amateur golfer
W. R. Titterton (1876–1963), British journalist, writer and poet, also friend and first biographer of G. K. Chesterton